Charles Mahoney may refer to:
Charles Mahoney (martyr) (c. 1640–1679), Irish priest and Catholic martyr
Charles Mahoney (artist) (1903–1968), English artist
Charles H. Mahoney (1886–1966), American politician, attorney and businessman
John Mahoney (Charles John Mahoney, 1940–2018), English-American actor